"Step in the Name of Love (Remix)" is a hit song by R&B singer R. Kelly.  Taken from the 2003 album Chocolate Factory, the song became the tenth single from Kelly (and the final one to date) to reach #1 on the R&B chart, particularly on the strength of the song's remix.  It also peaked at number nine on the pop charts on December 2, 2003. The original "Step in the Name of Love", which is on the unreleased 2002 album "Loveland" as well as the Chocolate Factory album, described a dance style initially created in Chicago called "stepping".  That dance, and the music associated with it, was heavily featured on disc one of his 2004 double album, "Happy People/U Saved Me". The song became an impromptu "anthem" for steppers and the dance. In the UK, the song was a double A-side with "Thoia Thoing".

Critical reception 
The Village Voice critic Robert Christgau found the remix of "Step in the Name of Love" to be "hugely engaging". However, he believed it was "cavalier" or "stupid" for Kelly,  amid his child pornography charges, to declare himself "the pied piper of r&b" given the moniker's "pedophilic implications".

Music video
The music video is directed by Little X.

Legacy
"Step in the Name of Love (Remix)" took 43 weeks to reach number one on the R&B/Hip Hop chart, making it the longest trip to number one in the chart's history. The song has spent 70 weeks on the same chart and is one of the songs that has spent the most weeks on that chart.

Track listing

UK CD single
 "Step in the Name of Love" (Remix) (Radio Edit)
 "Thoia Thong" (Album Version)
 "Thoia Thong" (Silk & Peoples Choice Remix)
 "Step in the Name of Love" (Remix) (Enhanced Video)

Charts

Weekly charts

Year-end charts

References

2003 singles
R. Kelly songs
Song recordings produced by R. Kelly
Songs written by R. Kelly
Music videos directed by Director X